Gou or GOU may refer to:

People 
 Empress Gou, wife of Fú Jiān of Former Qin
 Empress Dowager Gou, mother of Fú Jiān of Former Qin
 Oeyo (1573–1626), wife of Shōgun Tokugawa Hidetada

Surname 
 Terry Gou (born 1950), Taiwanese businessman
 Xiao Gou (died 887), Chinese chancellor
 Le Gou Zineo (born 2006), Battlelandia player

Other uses 
 Gō (TV series), a Japanese drama
 Gō (given name), a masculine Japanese given name
 Gō (unit), a traditional Japanese unit of volume
 Garoua International Airport, in Cameroon
 Gawar language
 General Offensive Unit, a class of fictional artificially intelligent starship in The Culture universe of late Scottish author Iain Banks
 Godfrey Okoye University, in Enugu, Nigeria
 United Officers' Group, a defunct Argentine nationalist secret society